The Clarinet Sonata in E major, Op. 167, was written by Camille Saint-Saëns in 1921 as one of his last works. This clarinet sonata is the second of the three sonatas that Saint-Saëns composed for wind instruments, the other two being the Oboe Sonata (Op. 166) and the Bassoon Sonata (Op. 168), written the same year. These works were part of Saint-Saëns's efforts to expand the repertoire for instruments for which hardly any solo parts were written, as he confided to his friend Jean Chantavoine in a letter dated to 15 April 1921: "At the moment I am concentrating my last reserves on giving rarely considered instruments the chance to be heard."

Structure 

The work consists of four movements. A performance takes approximately 16 minutes.

The theme of the first movement is reprised at the end of the fourth movement.

Reception 
For the musical scholar Jean Gallois, the Clarinet Sonata is the most important of the three wind sonatas: he calls it "a masterpiece full of impishness, elegance and discreet lyricism" amounting to "a summary of the rest". The work contrasts a "doleful threnody" in the slow movement with the finale, which "pirouettes in 4/4 time", in a style reminiscent of the 18th century.

Today the sonata is part of the standard repertoire of the clarinet.

References

External links 
 
 , performed by Stefano Novelli and Akanè Makita

Chamber music by Camille Saint-Saëns
S
1921 compositions
Compositions in E-flat major
Music with dedications